German submarine U-595 was a Type VIIC U-boat built for Nazi Germany's Kriegsmarine for service during World War II.
She was laid down on 4 January 1941 by Blohm & Voss, Hamburg as yard number 571, launched on 17 September 1941 and commissioned on 6 November 1941 under Oberleutnant zur See Jürgen Quaet-Faslem.

Design
German Type VIIC submarines were preceded by the shorter Type VIIB submarines. U-595 had a displacement of  when at the surface and  while submerged. She had two shafts and two  propellers.

U-595 was fitted with five  torpedo tubes (four fitted at the bow and one at the stern), fourteen torpedoes, one  SK C/35 naval gun, 220 rounds, and a  C/30 anti-aircraft gun. The boat had a complement of between forty-four and sixty.

Service history
The boat's career began with training at 8th U-boat Flotilla on 6 November 1941, followed by active service on 1 August 1942 as part of the 9th Flotilla for the remainder of her service.

In three patrols she sank no ships.

Fate
U-595 was sunk on 14 November 1942 in the Mediterranean in position , by depth charges from two RAF Hudson bombers from 608 Squadron. The depth charges damaged her so badly that she had to surface, and the commander took the decision to beach her on the Algerian coast near Ténès. During the air attack the crew were able to damage some aircraft with machine-gun fire. There were 45 survivors and no casualties.

Wolfpacks
U-595 took part in five wolfpacks, namely:
 Steinbrinck (6 – 9 August 1942)
 Pfeil (12 – 22 September 1942)
 Blitz (22 – 26 September 1942)
 Tiger (26 – 30 September 1942)
 Delphin (4 – 14 November 1942)

See also
 Mediterranean U-boat Campaign (World War II)
 Convoy SC 94

References

Bibliography

External links

German Type VIIC submarines
1941 ships
U-boats commissioned in 1941
U-boats sunk in 1942
U-boats sunk by British aircraft
World War II shipwrecks in the Mediterranean Sea
World War II submarines of Germany
Ships built in Hamburg
Maritime incidents in November 1942